

 
Hale is a locality in the Northern Territory of Australia located about  south of the territory capital of Darwin.

The locality’s boundaries and name were gazetted on 3 April 2007. It is named after the Hale River which is in turn named after Mathew Hale. It fully surrounds the Ltyentye Apurte Community.

The 2016 Australian census which was conducted in August 2016 reports that Hale had 79 people living within its boundaries.

Hale is located within the federal division of Lingiari, the territory electoral division of Namatjira and the local government area of the MacDonnell Region.

References

Populated places in the Northern Territory
MacDonnell Region